Georgios Andrianopoulos (May 1903 – 24 February 1980) was a Greek footballer. He played in three matches for the Greece national football team from 1929 to 1930. He was also part of Greece's squad for the football tournament at the 1920 Summer Olympics, but he did not play in any matches.

References

External links
 

1903 births
1980 deaths
Greek footballers
Greece international footballers
Place of birth missing
Association football forwards
Olympiacos F.C. players
Footballers from Piraeus